Vincent Stuckey (24 March 1771 - 8 May 1845) was a merchant and banker of Somerset and Gloucestershire whose note-issue in his heyday was the largest in England and Wales except for the Bank of England itself.

Early life
Stuckey was born at Langport on 24 March 1771.

Career
Stuckey was a partner in S & G Stuckey & Co. (later Stuckey's Banking Co.) from 1807 to 1845. In his heyday, his note-issue was the largest in England and Wales except for the Bank of England itself.

Death
Stuckey died at Langport on 8 May 1845.

See also
Parrett Navigation Company

References

Further reading
Saunders, Philip T. (1928) Stuckey's Bank. Taunton.
Gregory, T.E. (1936) The Westminster Bank through a Century, vol.1. Westminster Bank.
Pressnell, L.S. (1956) Country Banking in the Industrial Revolution.

External links 
http://www.langport.eu/stuckeys-bank.htm
http://heritagearchives.rbs.com/companies/list/stuckey-lean-and-co.html
http://www.yeovilhistory.info/stuckeysbank.htm

English bankers
1771 births
1845 deaths
People from Langport